The Wadakura Bridge is a bridge in Chiyoda, Tokyo.

External links

 

Bridges in Tokyo
Buildings and structures in Chiyoda, Tokyo